Margherita, Archduchess of Austria-Este ( Princess Margherita of Savoy-Aosta, 7 April 1930 – 10 January 2022) was an Italian princess, the first-born child of Amedeo, 3rd Duke of Aosta, and Princess Anne d'Orléans.

Biography
Margherita, born in the Royal Palace of Capodimonte, Naples in 1930, is the eldest daughter of Prince Amedeo of Savoy, Duke of Aosta, and Princess Anne d'Orléans, first cousins married in 1927. She has a younger sister, Marie Christine (born in 1933). The princess was baptised in the chapel of the Capodimonte Palace on 28 May 1930 with the names Margherita Isabella Maria Vittoria Emanuela Elena Gennara. Her godfather and godmother were the King of Italy Victor-Emmanuel III and her paternal grandmother Hélène d'Orléans.

Her father, the Duke of Aosta, was appointed Viceroy of Ethiopia on 21 December 1937, and Margherita spent part of her childhood in Africa. In 1940, she returned to Italy with her mother and her younger sister, Marie Christine, shortly before the outbreak of the Second World War. Her father, taken prisoner by the British, died prematurely of typhus in captivity, in Nairobi, on 3 March 1942.

At the beginning of the Second World War, Margherita lived with her sister and mother in a flat in the Pitti Palace in Florence. In 1943, Germany invaded Italy. In July 1944, the Duchess of Aosta and her two daughters were arrested by the Germans and deported to Austria, before being released in May 1945 and returning to Italy on 7 July. The fall of the Italian monarchy in June 1946 forced Margherita, her mother and her sister to leave the country and settle in Belgium, where they stayed for just over a year, before moving to Switzerland.

Marriage and issue
Margherita's family announced her engagement to Robert, Archduke of Austria-Este on 20 October 1953. They married on 28 December 1953 in Bourg-en-Bresse, Ain, France (civilly) and 29 December 1953 (religiously), in Royal Monastery of Brou. He was the second son of former Emperor Charles I of Austria and Zita of Bourbon-Parma. Robert was 38, and Margherita was 23. As the royal couple arrived for the first ceremony, hundreds of Austrians and Italians stood outside the town hall where the marriage was held. The wedding was also attended by former King Umberto II of Italy  and Robert's older brother Otto of Habsburg, the claimant to the Austrian throne. At six feet tall, Margherita was, according to some witnesses, an impressive sight. She wore an ivory gown made out of satin with a long train hung from a diamond tiara.

The couple took up residence in Paris, where Robert was a bank clerk. They had five children:

 Archduchess Maria Beatrice Anna Felicitas Zita Charlotte Adelheid Christina Elisabeth Gennara (11 December 1954). Married Count Riprand of Arco-Zinneberg, a great-grandson of the last Bavarian king, Ludwig III, and has issue. They have six daughters, including Olympia von und zu Arco-Zinneberg, who is married to Jean-Christophe, Prince Napoléon.
 Archduke Lorenz Otto Carl Amadeus Thadeus Maria Pius Andreas Marcus d'Aviano (16 December 1955), created Prince of Belgium on 10 November 1995. Married 22 September 1984 at Brussels, Princess Astrid of Belgium (b. 1962). They have five children.
 Archduke Gerhard Thaddäus Anton Marcus d'Aviano Maria Umberto Otto Carl Amadeus (30 October 1957) who wed Iris Jandrasits (1961) in 2015;
 Archduke Martin Carl Amadeo Maria (21 December 1959). Married Princess Katharina of Isenburg-Birstein. They have four children.
 Archduchess Isabella Maria Laura Helena Antonia Zita Anna Gennara (2 March 1963). Married Count Andrea Czarnocki-Lucheschi. They have four children.

Death
Margherita died on 10 January 2022, at the age of 91.

Ancestry

References

External links

1930 births
2022 deaths
Austrian princesses
Austria-Este
Nobility from Naples
Italian princesses
Princesses of Savoy
20th-century Italian women
21st-century Italian women